Marion Elizabeth "Betty" Craig (later Eaton, born September 26, 1957 in Brockville, Ontario) is a Canadian rower. She won a silver medal in the coxless pair event with Patricia Smith at the 1984 Summer Olympics. She also finished fifth in the same event at the 1976 Summer Olympics.

References

External links 
 

1957 births
Living people
Rowers from Ontario
Canadian female rowers
Olympic medalists in rowing
Olympic rowers of Canada
Olympic silver medalists for Canada
Sportspeople from Brockville
Rowers at the 1976 Summer Olympics
Rowers at the 1984 Summer Olympics
World Rowing Championships medalists for Canada
Medalists at the 1984 Summer Olympics
20th-century Canadian women